Doriopsis granulosa is a species of sea slug, a dorid nudibranch, a marine gastropod mollusk in the family Dorididae.

Distribution
This species was described from the Hawaiian Islands, then called, by Europeans, the Sandwich Islands. It has been reported from many places in the Indo-West Pacific. Different colour forms may turn out to be a species complex.

References

Dorididae
Gastropods described in 1860